In mathematics, the ELSV formula, named after its four authors , , Michael Shapiro, Alek Vainshtein, is an equality between a Hurwitz number (counting ramified coverings of the sphere) and an integral over the moduli space of stable curves.

Several fundamental results in the intersection theory of moduli spaces of curves can be deduced from the ELSV formula, including the Witten conjecture, the Virasoro constraints, and the -conjecture.

It is generalized by the Gopakumar–Mariño–Vafa formula.

The formula 
Define the Hurwitz number

as the number of ramified coverings of the complex projective line (Riemann sphere,  that are connected curves of genus g, with n numbered preimages of the point at infinity having multiplicities  and m more simple branch points. Here if a covering has a nontrivial automorphism group G it should be counted with weight .

The ELSV formula then reads

 

Here the notation is as follows:

  is a nonnegative integer;
  is a positive integer;
  are positive integers;
  is the number of automorphisms of the n-tuple 
 
  is the moduli space of stable curves of genus g  with n marked points;
 E is the Hodge vector bundle and c(E*) the total Chern class of its dual vector bundle;
 ψi is the first Chern class of the cotangent line bundle to the i-th marked point.

The numbers

in the left-hand side have a combinatorial definition and satisfy properties that can be proved combinatorially. Each of these properties translates into a statement on the  integrals on the right-hand side of the ELSV formula .

The Hurwitz numbers 
The Hurwitz numbers

also have a definition in purely algebraic terms. With K = k1 + ... + kn and m = K + n + 2g − 2, let τ1, ..., τm be transpositions in the symmetric group SK and σ a permutation with n numbered cycles of lengths k1, ..., kn. Then

is a transitive factorization of identity of type (k1, ..., kn) if the product

equals the identity permutation and the group generated by

is transitive.

Definition.  is the number of transitive factorizations of identity of type (k1, ..., kn) divided by K!.

Example A. The number  is 1/k! times the number of lists of transpositions  whose product is a k-cycle. In other words,  is 1/k times the number of factorizations of a given k-cycle into a product of k + 2g − 1 transpositions.

The equivalence between the two definitions of Hurwitz numbers (counting ramified coverings of the sphere, or counting transitive factorizations) is established by describing a ramified covering by its monodromy. More precisely: choose a base point on the sphere, number its preimages from 1 to K (this introduces a factor of K!, which explains the division by it), and consider the monodromies of the covering about the branch point. This leads to a transitive factorization.

The integral over the moduli space 
The moduli space  is a smooth Deligne–Mumford stack of (complex) dimension 3g − 3 + n. (Heuristically this behaves much like complex manifold, except that integrals of characteristic classes that are integers for manifolds are rational numbers for Deligne–Mumford stacks.)

The Hodge bundle E is the rank g vector bundle over the moduli space  whose fiber over a curve (C, x1, ..., xn) with n marked points is the space of abelian differentials on C. Its Chern classes are denoted by

We have

The ψ-classes.

The integrand. Thus the integrand is a product of n + 1 factors. We expand this product, extract from it the part of degree 3g − 3 + n and integrate it over the moduli space.

The integral as a polynomial. It follows that the integral

is a symmetric polynomial in variables k1, ..., kn, whose monomials have degrees between 3g − 3 + n and 2g − 3 + n. The coefficient of the monomial  equals

where 

Remark. The polynomiality of the numbers

was first conjectured by I. P. Goulden and D. M. Jackson. No proof independent from the ELSV formula is known.

Example B. Let g = n = 1. Then

Example 
Let n = g = 1.  To simplify the notation, denote k1 by k. We have m = K + n + 2g − 2 = k + 1.

According to Example B, the ELSV formula in this case reads

On the other hand, according to Example A, the Hurwitz number h1, k equals 1/k times the number of ways to decompose a k-cycle in the symmetric group Sk into a product of k + 1 transpositions. In particular, h1, 1 = 0 (since there are no transpositions in S1), while h1, 2 = 1/2 (since there is a unique factorization of the transposition (1 2) in S2 into a product of three transpositions).

Plugging these two values into the ELSV formula we find

From which we deduce

History 
The proof announced by the four initial authors followed .

Idea of proof 
Let  be the space of stable maps f from a genus g curve to P1(C) such that f has exactly n poles of orders .

The branching morphism br or the Lyashko–Looijenga map assigns to  the unordered set of its m branch points in C with multiplicities taken into account. Actually, this definition only works if f is a smooth map. But it has a natural extension to the space of stable maps. For instance, the value of f on a node is considered a double branch point, as can be seen by looking at the family of curves Ct given by the equation xy = t and the family of maps ft(x, y) = x + y. As t → 0, two branch points of ft tend towards the value of f0 at the node of C0.

The branching morphism is of finite degree, but has infinite fibers. Our aim is now to compute its degree in two different ways.

The first way is to count the preimages of a generic point in the image. In other words, we count the ramified coverings of P1(C) with a branch point of type (k1, ..., kn) at ∞ and m more fixed simple branch points. This is precisely the Hurwitz number .

The second way to find the degree of br is to look at the preimage of the most degenerate point, namely, to put all m branch points together at 0 in C.

Indeed, given a stable curve with n marked points we send this curve to 0 in P1(C) and attach to its marked points n rational components on which the stable map has the form . Thus we obtain all stable maps in  unramified outside 0 and ∞. Standard methods of algebraic geometry allow one to find the degree of a map by looking at an infinite fiber and its normal bundle. The result is expressed as an integral of certain characteristic classes over the infinite fiber. In our case this integral happens to be equal to the right-hand side of the ELSV formula.

Thus the ELSV formula expresses the equality between two ways to compute the degree of the branching morphism.

References 

Algebraic curves
Moduli theory
Permutations
Theorems in algebraic geometry